= Fels v Knowles =

- Court: Court of Appeal of New Zealand
- Full case name: Fels v Knowles
- Decided: 16 May 1906
- Citation: [1906] NZGazLawRp 66; (1906) 26 NZLR 604; (1906) 8 GLR 627
- Transcript: Court of Appeal judgment

Fels v Knowles [1906] NZGazLawRp 66; (1906) 26 NZLR 604; (1906) 8 GLR 627 is a cited case in New Zealand land law.
